Radiation Roy is a supervillain from the DC comics universe.

Fictional character biography

Trying For the Legion
Roy Travich, after receiving a large inheritance from a deceased relative, uses it to gain a super power and join his idols: The Legion of Super-Heroes. He eventually acquires the ability to emit radiation from his body. After trying out as Radiation Roy, he was rejected for not having enough control over his powers, as the radiation could potentially harm the Legion and innocent bystanders. It was later revealed that when Saturn Girl read his mind, she was so horrified by his dark and twisted inner desires that she couldn't sleep for two nights afterward.

Legion of Super-Villains
Bitter and angry, Roy helped found the Legion of Super-Villains to fight against the Super-Heroes. He entered into a short-lived relationship with fellow LSV member Spider-Girl. He quit the Legion of Super-Villains soon after. Over time, Roy's body became badly ravaged by its radiation output. He lost his teeth and grew pus-filled tumors. Eventually, he was forced to wear a red containment suit to keep his powers under control.

Justice League of Earth
Roy later founded, with other Earth-born Legion rejects, the Justice League of Earth. Using a crystal tablet their leader Earth-Man found, they started a misinformation campaign touting that Superman was from Earth not Krypton and that he stood against aliens, successfully turning humans against aliens. While spreading their lies, the League hunted any aliens they could find. Shortly thereafter, Superman, the Legion of Super-Heroes, and the Legion of Substitute-Heroes exposed them. The League were defeated and sent to the prison planet Takron-Galtos.

In Final Crisis: Legion of 3 Worlds, Roy and the League were freed by Superboy-Prime. The League subsequently joined his version of the Legion of Super-Villains. During an attack on the United Planets, Roy killed Myg (the second Karate Kid).

Threeboot
Radiation Roy briefly appears in the "Threeboot" Legion continuity, as an angry teenager who lashes out at Science Police officers with gamma radiation, while someone in the crowd yells out "Roy, No!". He is quickly stopped by Cosmic Boy and Supergirl.

Powers and abilities
Roy had the ability to release radiation from his body. Anyone exposed suffers from dizziness and radiation poisoning. Roy himself was not immune to his power, so he wears a red containment suit to protect himself. The limits of these abilities have never been defined.

References

External links
http://www.comicvine.com/radiation-roy/29-31023/
https://web.archive.org/web/20081219220507/http://www.legiononline.net/volume1/bios2.html

Comics characters introduced in 1965